Subtle expressions occur when a person's emotional response to a situation, to another person or to the environment around them is of low intensity. They also occur when a person is just starting to feel an emotion.

Unlike microexpressions, subtle expressions are not associated with the length of time that they are on the face, but rather with the intensity of the emotion that is occurring.

As their name suggests, subtle expressions are very subtle. Even a slight tightening of the lips can be a reliable sign that someone is angry.

See also
Nonverbal communication
Body language
Facial Action Coding System

References

External links
 Subtle Expression Definition"

Facial expressions
Emotion
Nonverbal communication

pl:Mikroekspresja
zh:微表情